Coleophora hippodromica is a moth of the family Coleophoridae. It is found in North Africa.

The larvae feed on Astragalus gombo. They create a dark brown leaf case, composed of a single piece of leaf (mined tip of a leaflet). Larvae can be found from autumn to March.

References

hippodromica
Moths described in 1907
Moths of Africa